Project Shoal was an underground nuclear test that took place on October 26, 1963 within the Sand Springs Range, approximately  southeast of Fallon, Nevada, in a granite formation of the range. The site was selected because its earthquake activity afforded a basis for seismic signal comparisons.

Project Shoal was part of the Vela Uniform program sponsored jointly by the U.S Department of Defense and the U.S. Atomic Energy Commission. Vela Uniform was directed toward locating, detecting, and identifying underground detonations. The objective of Project Shoal was to detonate a nuclear device underground in an active seismic area so that seismic traces for the test and prior earthquakes could be compared and differentiated.
                                                            

The test was performed on October 26, 1963.

References

Explosions in 1963
Churchill County, Nevada
American nuclear weapons testing
1963 in the United States
Explosions in the United States